The Romania women's national under-16 and under-17 basketball team is a national basketball team of Romania, administered by the Romanian Basketball Federation.
It represents the country in women's international under-16 and under-17 (under age 16 and under age 17) basketball competitions.

See also
Romania women's national basketball team
Romania women's national under-19 basketball team
Romania men's national under-17 basketball team

References

External links
Archived records of Romania team participations

Basketball in Romania
Basketball teams in Romania
Women's national under-17 basketball teams
Basketball